Robert Gwathmey (January 24, 1903 – September 21, 1988) was an American social realist painter. His wife was photographer Rosalie Gwathmey(September 15, 1908 – February 12, 2001) and his son was architect Charles Gwathmey (June 19, 1938 – August 3, 2009).

Robert was born to Robert Gwathmey Sr. (1866-1902) and Eva Mortimer Harrison (1868-1941). His half sisters were Kathrine and Ida Carrington. Robert Sr. was killed at work by an explosion and his wife was killed in a vehicular accident.

Education
Gwathmey attended North Carolina State College in Raleigh, studying business from 1922-1923. He did not think this path would take him anywhere so he got a job on a freighter and later studied a year at the Maryland Institute of Design in Baltimore. The Pennsylvania Academy of the Fine Arts in Philadelphia is where he completed his education of the arts; he spent four years there.

In 1929 and 1930, Gwathmey was the winner of the Cresson Traveling Scholarship, which allowed him the opportunity to study abroad in the summers. He traveled to Paris, Madrid, Barcelona, Genoa, Pisa, Florence, Venice, Vienna, Munich, and London.

Artwork

Throughout his studies, Robert Gwathmey was influenced by many artists including Pablo Picasso, Henri Matisse, Vincent van Gogh, and Rufino Tamayo from the European modernists, French satirist Honoré Daumier, realist painter Jean-François Millet along with Daumier and Degas.

Gwathmey is known for simplifying compositions and using symbolic abstraction to create his messages. His style is recognized by the color, shapes, and figures he uses in his artwork.

When asked about being a "social artist" this was his reply:
"I'm a social being and I don't see how you can be an artist and be separate....Artists have eyes...You go home. You see things that are almost forgotten. It's always shocking."

Life

After finishing school, Robert Gwathmey was a professor at several colleges: Temple University in Philadelphia (1930-1932), Beaver College in Glenside, PA (1930-1937), Carnegie Institute of Technology, Pittsburgh, PA (1939-1942), the Cooper Union School of Art, New York City (1942-1968), New School for Social Research, New York (1946-1949), and Boston University (1968-1969). He was an instructor to artists Faith Ringgold and Alvin Carl Hollingsworth.

He was also an activist for several political movements; because of this he was watched by the FBI for the last twenty-seven years of his life.

Awards

1973 Elected into National Academy of Design
1944 Rosenwald Fellowship; Second Prize, “Painting in the United States,” Carnegie Institute of Technology; First Prize, Artists for Victory Exhibition at National Graphic Arts Competition; Purchase Prize, America at War Competition sponsored by Artists for Victory
1941 First Purchase Prize, Contemporary Water Color Show, San Diego Fine Art Gallery
1941 Watercolor Prize, Associated Artists of Pittsburgh
1929-30 Cresson Fellowship

Exhibitions
2008 “Painting in the United States: 1943-1949,” Westmoreland Museum of American Art, Greensburg, PA “The American Scene,” British Museum, London
2007 “American Social Realism: 1920-1950,” Forum Gallery, New York City
2004 “Everyday Mysteries: Modern and Contemporary Still Life,” DC Moore Gallery, New York City
2000 “Robert Gwathmey: Master Painter,” Telfair Art Museum, Savannah, GA; Pennsylvania Academy of Fine Art, PA “Robert Gwathmey: A Retrospective,” Virginia Historical Society, Richmond, VA
1999 “Robert Gwathmey: Master Painter of the Old South,” Butler Museum of American Art, Youngstown, OH “Childe Hassam, Robert Gwathmey, Fairfield Porter, Ben Shahn, and Jules Pascin,” ACA Galleries, New York City
1998 “In the Eye of the Storm: An Art of Conscience 1930-1970,” Frederick R. Weismann Art Museum, Minneapolis, MN
1997 Greg Kucera Gallery, Seattle WA
1985 Exhibition at the Cooper Union School of Art
1976 Solo exhibition at St. Mary’s College of Maryland Solo exhibition at Terry Dintenfass Inc., New York City
1967 Annual Exhibition of Contemporary American Painting, Whitney Museum of American Art, New York City
1966 Brooklyn Museum, NY
1956 “Let’s Face It: An Exhibition of Contemporary Portraits,” Contemporary Arts Museum, Houston, TX
1952 Walker Art Center, Minneapolis, MN
1946 Solo show at the ACA Gallery in New York City Joint exhibition with photographer (and wife) Rosalie Hook Gwathmey at the Virginia Museum of Fine Arts in Richmond. “Advancing American Art,” overseas traveling exhibition sponsored by the US State Department
1944 Walker Art Center, Minneapolis, MN
1943 Walker Art Center, Minneapolis, MN Whitney Museum of American Art, NY Art Institute of Chicago, IL 
1941 ACA Gallery in New York City (solo) Contemporary Water Color Show, San Diego Fine Arts Gallery

Collections
Brooklyn Museum
The Johnson Collection
Kalamazoo Institute of Arts, Kalamazoo, MI
LACMA, Los Angeles
Museum of Modern Art, New York
Philadelphia Museum of Art
Smithsonian American Art Museum
Whitney Museum of American Art

In popular culture
In Elia Kazan's novel The Arrangement when Evangelos is describing to Florence the property that she can keep for herself he says: "...all paintings, even that by Picasso and Gwathmey."

References

1903 births
1988 deaths
20th-century American painters
American male painters
People from Richmond, Virginia
Painters from Virginia
Pennsylvania Academy of the Fine Arts alumni
Temple University faculty
Arcadia University faculty
Carnegie Mellon University faculty
Cooper Union faculty
The New School faculty
Boston University faculty
American muralists
Section of Painting and Sculpture artists
National Academy of Design members
Social realist artists
Members of the American Academy of Arts and Letters